Saydal Sokhandan was an Afghan poet, a Maoist activist, and a student leader. He was studying at the Kabul University in the early-1970s. He organized students from Progressive Youth Organization in the university. PYO is considered the first revolutionary communist formation in Afghanistan with Maoist ideology.

Poetry
Saydal Sokhandan has many poems in the Pashto language. One of his poems is:

په ټوپک او په برچه دی استعمار  پاره پاره کړه
شابه شابه ای کارګره خپل ایمان غیرت ښکاره کړه

Translation:

Tear apart colonialism with your gun and knife
Bravo Bravo Workers show your faith and determination

References

Afghan communists
20th-century Afghan poets
Pashtun people
Maoists
1972 deaths
Year of birth missing
Maoism in Afghanistan